Mahathi Fuel Transport and Storage Depot is a privately-owned inland, lakeside fuel transport and storage depot under construction in Uganda. When completed, gasoline, kerosene, diesel-fuel and Jet A1 will be delivered by ship from Kisumu, across the lake in neighboring Kenya. The fuel will be stored here and conveyed by truck to final destinations in Uganda, Rwanda, Burundi and South Sudan, significantly cutting down delivery times and transport costs.

Location
The geographical coordinates of Mahathi Fuel Transport and Storage Depot are 00°07'23.0"N, 32°34'10.0"E (Latitude:0.123056; Longitude:32.569444).

Overview
The facility is owned by a consortium, comprising (a) Mahathi Infra Group of India (b) Siginon Group of Kenya and (c) Fortune Energy of Uganda. This consortium has registered a special purpose vehicle (SPV) company to carry out the project. The SPV company is called Mahathi Infra Uganda Limited.

The depot has 14 storage tanks with capacity to hold  of fuel. This allows plenty of room to trade in fuel among the destination countries, considering that Uganda uses only  of fuel daily. Major oil companies in the region, including Shell Oil, Total SE and Mogas, have signed supply contracts with Mahathi Infra Uganda Limited.

In addition to the storage tanks, Uganda’s part of the project involves the construction of a 220-metre-long jetty including four dedicated pipelines, one each for the four refined petroleum types. Each tanker barge has capacity equivalent to about 150 fuel trucks.

Costs and funding
The total cost of the project is budgeted at US$270 million. Of the total, US$70 million was borrowed from Equity Group. The remaining US$200 million was raised by the consortium member companies.

Construction
Construction began in 2017. As of September 2020, works were 80 percent complete, with commissioning expected in the first half of 2021.

As of October 2021, construction was nearly complete, with commercial commissioning anticipated in December 2021.

In January 2022, the New Vision newspaper reported that commercial operations were planned to begin in March 2022.

See also
 Bukasa Inland Port

References

External links
 About Mahathi Infra Uganda Refined Oil Products Project
 President meets L. Victoria fuel transport investors As of 14 March 2016.

Wakiso District
Ports and harbours of Uganda
Lake Victoria